Jean Colombier (born 25 December 1945 in Saint-Yrieix-sous-Aixe) is a French writer, laureate of the 1990 edition of the Prix Renaudot.

Work 
Novels
 Les Matins céladon (1988)
 Les Frères Romance (1990), Calmann-Lévy publishing house – Prix Renaudot
 Béloni (1992)
 Villa Mathilde (1994)
 J'ai trop regardé les étoiles (1999)
 La Théorie des pénitents (2006)
 DCD (2009)

Short stories
 La Gra birtjdnde Boucle (1996), collective work
 Drôle d'oiseau (1997), collective work
 Rencontres ovales (2004), collective work
 Nos terres de rugby (2007), collective work
 Le Cantique de Billie (2008)
 Balade en Limousin (2009), collective work

Art books
 La Haute-Vienne (1994)
 Les Frères Romance (1990)

References 

1945 births
Living people
People from Haute-Vienne
20th-century French novelists
Prix Renaudot winners